The Ukraine national under-18 baseball team is the national under-18 team representing Ukraine in international baseball competitions. The organization is currently ranked 29th in the world by the World Baseball Softball Confederation.  They compete in the bi-annual European Junior Baseball Championship.

See also
 Ukraine national baseball team
 U-18 Baseball World Cup

References

National under-18 baseball teams
Baseball
Baseball in Ukraine